Justice Dipeba (born 3 December 1973) is an Olympic athlete from Botswana who competed at the 1996 Summer Olympics. He competed at the Men's 200 metres event representing Botswana. However, he was placed 5th at 21.09 in Heat 10, and thus did not advance any further. In addition, Dipeba was also the flag bearer of Botswana during the 1996 Summer Olympics opening ceremony.

Dipeba is now a personal coach of Botswana sprinter Isaac Makwala.

References

External links
 

1973 births
Living people
Botswana male sprinters
Olympic athletes of Botswana
Athletes (track and field) at the 1994 Commonwealth Games
Athletes (track and field) at the 1996 Summer Olympics
Athletes (track and field) at the 1998 Commonwealth Games
Commonwealth Games competitors for Botswana